Stenidea nigrolineata is a species of beetle in the family Cerambycidae. It was described by Stephan von Breuning in 1942. It is known from Eritrea and Somalia.

References

nigrolineata
Beetles described in 1942